A Music Victoria study finds Melbourne hosts 62,000 live concerts annually, making it one of the live music capitals of the world. Victoria is host to more than three times the live performance national average, making it the live music capital of the country. Melbourne is host to more music venues per capita than Austin, Texas.

History

The Esplanade Hotel, built in 1878, one of the earliest, largest and most prominent 19th century resort hotels in Victoria, has served as a venue for various styles through the 20th century. Between 1920 and 1925, the "Eastern Tent Ballroom" constructed to the rear of the site became an important jazz venue and dance venue in St Kilda, one of the main entertainment districts in Melbourne at the time. In the 1970s, the hotel's Gershwin Room, a grand dining room, was turned into a disco, complete with flashing Saturday Night Fever-style dance floor. Since the 1970s, it has hosted primarily rock-related acts and is currently the longest continuously running live music venue in Australia.

Liquor licensing laws

The Keep The Vineyard Live body, supported by Australian music giants like Mental As Anything's Greedy Smith, Molly Meldrum, Triple M radio's Mieke Buchan and Underbelly actor Damian Walshe-Howling, who together with SLAM, packed the St Kilda Town Hall chamber for an emotional council meeting on the matter. The rally attracted the attention of the state government whom, on 28 June 2010 at the 11th hour, sent an express letter to councillors indicating its support for the continuation of the St Kilda live music venue, and thus swayed the council's decision to retain The Vineyard Bar as a live music venue.

Commercial industry

Melbourne's popular, commercial music scene has fostered many internationally renowned artists and musicians. The 1960s gave rise to many performers including Olivia Newton-John, John Farnham, Graeme Bell, and folk group The Seekers. The 1970s and 1980s saw many acts getting their first big breaks on Melbourne's Countdown, including the Little River Band, Mondo Rock, Australian Crawl, The Uncanny X-Men and Crowded House who later wrote a song about the city of Melbourne called Four Seasons In One Day. Successful Melbourne artists include Hunters & Collectors, Nick Cave, Flea (of the Red Hot Chili Peppers), Gotye and Something for Kate. Melbourne is also the home of music journalist and commentator Ian "Molly" Meldrum.

More recent notable Melbourne acts include Jet, Rogue Traders, Taxiride, Missy Higgins, Madison Avenue, Anthony Callea, The Living End and The Temper Trap. Melbourne-based television shows Young Talent Time and Neighbours gave many singers a launching pad to international success. Local talents to come from these shows include Kylie Minogue, Dannii Minogue, Tina Arena, Jamie Redfern and Jason Donovan. Another Music TV show that began in Melbourne was Turn It Up!. It was first shown on Melbourne's Channel 31 and then relayed via satellite and rebroadcast terrestrially to major TV networks in over 22 countries. The show had the second largest viewing audience around the world, beaten only by the audience of American Bandstand. In one episode, the show presented Melbourne's annual festival Moomba to a world audience.

Independent scene

Melbourne has one of the most extensive and successful alternative, DIY, avant-garde, experimental, independent music scenes in the world. A variety of factors including a relative abundance of venues, independent record labels, music street press, and strong support from local community radio (such as PBS, 3RRR, 3CR, 3SYN), have enabled the city to enjoy a depth, diversity and longevity of independent music not seen in other Australian cities. Melbourne's independent music industry has been the subject of two documentary films, Sticky Carpet in 2006 and the DIY film Super8 Diaries Project in 2008. Some of the most important and influential alternative artists emerged from Melbourne in the late 1970s and early 1980s, Post-punk band The Birthday Party are one of "the darkest and most challenging post-punk groups to emerge in the early '80s." One act from Melbourne, Dead Can Dance, a duo, mixed Dark Wave with classical music, thus founding the genre Neoclassical Dark Wave. Other notable independent artists from Melbourne include: Cut Copy, The Drones, TISM, Eddy Current Suppression Ring, Rowland S. Howard, Dirty Three, The Avalanches and The Great Elevator.

Little Band scene

The Little Band scene is the name given to an experimental post-punk scene which flourished in Melbourne's inner suburbs from 1978 until early 1981. Led by Primitive Calculators and Whirlywirld, the scene involved many short-lived bands which often changed names and lineups, sometimes on a weekly basis. Approximately 50 people were in playing little bands during the scene's creative peak, including members of Dead Can Dance, Hunters & Collectors and Boom Crash Opera. The scene served as the backdrop of the 1986 cult film Dogs in Space.

Dolewave

The term "dolewave" was coined in the early 2010s to describe a Melbourne indie scene featuring Dick Diver, Twerps, Scott & Charlene's Wedding, and other groups. Courtney Barnett later became associated with the scene.

Venues

Stadiums, concert halls and outdoor venues
MCG - 108,000
Docklands Stadium - 56,347
Sidney Myer Music Bowl - 30,000 - Fixed seats 2,030
Rod Laver Arena - 16,200
Hisense Arena - 11,000
Forum Theatre - 2,000 standing (Forum 1). 520 seated (Forum 2)
Melbourne Recital Centre 1,000
Festival Hall - Seated: 1,741, standing: 2,600
Palais Theatre - 2,896
Abbotsford Convent - Abbotsford
 The Testing Grounds - Southbank
Victorian Arts Centre (inc Hamer Hall capacity 2,261. State Theatre 2,079 and others)

Concert clubs
Esplanade Hotel (The Espy) - St Kilda
Corner Hotel, Richmond. Band room capacity is between 800 and 850.
The Tote Hotel - Collingwood. Capacity 200
Empress Hotel, Fitzroy North Has not had bands since 2013.
The Old Bar - Fitzroy
Cherry Bar - City
Manchester Lane - City
Bennetts Lane Jazz Club - City

Festivals

Melbourne Music Week
 Melbourne Festival
Future Music Festival
Melbourne Fringe Festival
What Is Music
Big Day Out
St Jerome's Laneway Festival
St Kilda Festival
Sydney Road Street Party
Melbourne Jazz Festival
Melbourne Jazz Fringe Festival

Publications and press
The Music (previously Inpress) - street press / website
Beat Magazine - street press / website
Rhythms Magazine - Americana focused

Local radio
3PBS, Progressive Broadcasting Service - progressive arts & music
3RRR, Triple R - local independent music
3CR - local community, activism & music
3SCB Southern Melbourne - aussie music
3KND, Kool N' Deadly - Indigenous Australian radio
SYN FM, Student Youth Network - student & youth
3ZZZ - multicultural community
3JOY - gay & lesbian
3MBS - classical & jazz

Instrument manufacturers

Cole Clark - guitars, since 200?
Maton Guitars - guitars, since 1946
Wertheim Pianos - pianos, from 1908 to 1935

In media

Popular Songs

Many musical acts have written music with their origins, suburbs or Melbourne in general as their subject matter. Singer Paul Kelly wrote several well-known songs about aspects of the city close to the heart of many Melburnians, notably "Leaps and Bounds" and "From St Kilda to King's Cross", while bands like Australian Crawl and Skyhooks wrote some more tongue-in-cheek songs about Melbourne; "Balwyn Calling", "Carlton (Lygon Street Limbo)" and "Toorak Cowboy" are examples. The Living End wrote a song entitled "West End Riot" about differences between eastern and western suburbs in Melbourne's inner city.

Film

Dogs in Space (1986) - portraying 1978
Sticky Carpet (2006) - documenting the early first decade of the 21st century

Television
Countdown - live music and music videos, filmed in Melbourne and broadcast Australia-wide 1974–1987.
RocKwiz - an SBS music quiz show, filmed in Melbourne and broadcast Australia-wide since 2005
Spicks and Specks - an ABC music quiz show, filmed in Melbourne and broadcast Australia-wide since 2005

See also

Australian Institute of Music
List of songs about Melbourne
List of music venues in Melbourne
Martin Martini and the Bone Palace Orchestra
Music of Australia
Culture of Australia
Culture of Melbourne

References

External links
Australian Music Office - Australian Government organisation aimed at promoting export initiatives for Australian artists and music companies
An interview with Rebekah Duke: Melbourne's inner-northern live music venues and social scenes - Samuel Whiting
 Bluescrawler Blues & Blues Music Search Engine
 Live Music Venues Melbourne - A source of all live music venues in Melbourne, Australia

 
Music scenes